Lee Mackey (born 1988) is an Irish hurler who currently plays as a right wing-back for the London senior hurling team.

Background
Mackey began his inter-county career as a member of the Tipperary minor, under-21, intermediate and senior hurling teams. After emigrating from Ireland he subsequently linked up with the London senior hurling team. As an inter-county hurler he has won one Christy Ring Cup winners' medal.

Currently
At club level Mackey currently plays with the Seán Treacy's club. He previously played with Carrick Davins in Tipperary.

References

1988 births
Living people
Carrick Davins hurlers
Seán Treacy's hurlers
Tipperary inter-county hurlers
London inter-county hurlers